Water polo at the 1948 Summer Olympics – Men's team squads

CF=Centre Forward
CB=Centre Back
D=Defender
GK=Goalkeeper

Argentina

Head coach:

Italy

Italy entered a squad of nine players. They scored 39 goals.

Head coach:

Hungary

Hungary entered a squad of eleven players. They scored 38 goals.

Head coach:

India

India ranked 9th in the games and scored 10 goals.

Squad

Gora SealSamarendra ChatterjeeAjoy ChatterjeeSuhas ChatterjeeDwarkadas MukharjiDurga DasJamini DassSachin NagIsaac MansoorJahan Ahir

Australia

Head coach:

References

1948 Summer Olympics